"Ur So F**king Cool" (stylized as Ur So F**kInG cOoL (on-cover writing, pronounced You're So Fucking Cool), uncensored Ur So Fucking Cool or Ur So Cool on clean versions) is a song by Australian singer Tones and I. It was released on 29 May 2020 by Bad Batch Records and distributed by Sony Music in Australia and New Zealand and globally by Elektra Records. It was written by Toni Watson ( Tones and I).

Background 

In May 2020 Tones and I explained to Poppy Reid of Rolling Stone (Australia), that "You're So Fucking Cool", is about a party she attended in Los Angeles. Reid observed, "there are elements of her true self in the music: frustration, longing, loneliness, playfulness." Tones announced the release of the song on 26 May 2020.

Critical reception 
The song was panned by critics and was included on a list of the worst songs of 2020 published by Insider; its lyrics were described as "condescending and bitter".

Music video 

The music video was released on 29 May 2020, and was directed by Tones and I, Nick Kozakis and Liam Kelly. The cover art for the single depicts the artist in seven different guises: all appear in the music video. Tones and I was able to appear as multiple characters in one scene due to the use of a robotic camera that filmed duplicated shots over a 3 day period.
The music video was nominated for Best Video at the ARIA Music Awards of 2020.

Charts

Weekly charts

Year-end charts

Certifications

Release history

References

2020 singles
2020 songs
Tones and I songs
Song recordings produced by Steve Mac
Song recordings produced by Tones and I
Songs written by Tones and I